Max Kurnik (1 November 1819 – 8 April 1881) was a German writer and theatre critic.

Life 
Born in Zaniemyśl, Kurnik was one of the leading left-liberal journalists in Breslau from around the middle of the 19th century. In 1851, he founded the first telegraph office in Silesia. He worked for the Schlesische Zeitung and later for the Breslauer Zeitung as a theatre and music critic. He was close friend with Karl von Holtei.

Alexander Moszkowski reported in his autobiography about Kurnik's apparently rather conservative taste in music:

Kurnik died in Wrocław at the age of 61.

Work 
 Gotthold Ephraim Lessing. Ausgewählte Dramen analytisch erläutert.  1845
 Nathan der Weise.
 Goethe's Frauen. In zwei Lieferungen, Joh. Urban Kern, Breslau 1848 and 1849
 Karl von Holtei. Ein Lebensbild, Berlin 1880
 Theater-Erinnerungen, Janke Verlag, Berlin 1882
 Ein Menschenalter Theater-Erinnerungen (1848–1880), Bertrams Print on Demand,

References

Further reading 
 Hans Jessen: Max Kurnik. Ein Breslauer Journalist (1819–1881), Publication of the Breslauer Zeitung, Breslau 1927.

External links 

 
 Europeana: Max Kurnik

19th-century German journalists
German theatre critics
1819 births
1881 deaths
People from Środa Wielkopolska County